This article is a list of historic places in central Newfoundland. These properties are entered on the Canadian Register of Historic Places, whether they are federal, provincial, or municipal. The list contains entries from communities in census divisions 2, 3, 6, and 8. This grouping encompasses the central portions of the island of Newfoundland, including communities on Notre Dame Bay, the Burin Peninsula, and the southern shore between the Burin Peninsula and Cape Ray.

List of historic places

See also

 List of historic places in Newfoundland and Labrador
 List of National Historic Sites of Canada in Newfoundland and Labrador

Central Newfoundland